Little Mosquito Creek is a stream in Pottawattamie County, Iowa, in the United States. It is a tributary of Mosquito Creek, from which it took its name.

See also
List of rivers of Iowa

References

Rivers of Pottawattamie County, Iowa
Rivers of Iowa